DMS may refer to:

Science and technology

Computing
 Document management system
 Digital Media Server, a category within the Digital Living Network Alliance standard
 Disk Masher System, compression software for the Amiga computer
 Unisys DMS, a Unisys OS 2200 database
 Unisys DMSII
 Digital Microsystems, Inc., an early microcomputer company
 Digital Multiplex System, a telephone exchange system
 Dealership management system, for car dealerships
 DMS Software Reengineering Toolkit, program transformation tools
 DMS-59, a video connector supporting two displays

Chemistry and materials science
 Differential mobility spectrometry in ion-mobility spectrometry–mass spectrometry
 Dilute magnetic semiconductor, semiconductors with magnetic properties
 Dimethyl sulfate, a methylating agent
 Dimethyl sulfide, an organosulfur compound
 N,N-Dimethylsphingosine
 Dimethylstilbestrol, a nonsteroidal estrogen

Other uses in science and technology
 Dead man's switch
 Degree-Minute-Second, sexagesimal degree divisions
 Diagnostic medical sonography, in ultrasound imaging
 Distribution management system, of electrical energy
 Dynamic message sign, a variable-message traffic sign
 Delusional misidentification syndrome - a class of mental delusions, caused by various neurological diseases.
 Driver Monitoring System - monitors that the driver of a car is awake and alert

Education
 Delft Management Society, a student society of Delft University of Technology, The Netherlands
 Post-Graduate Diploma in Management Studies (post-nominal letters D.M.S.)
 Dartmouth Medical School
  Demonstration Multipurpose School (DMS), Mysore, India

Military
 Decoration for Meritorious Services, South Africa until 1987
 Distinguished Military Service Medal, Papua New Guinea
 Defence Medical Services, UK
 Director Medical Services (UK), Army Medical Services
 DMS Maritime, providing services to the Australian navy
 Defense Message System, in the US Department of Defense
 US Navy hull classification symbol for "destroyer minesweeper"

Other uses
 Design Manufacture Service, an outsourcing business model
 Daimler/Leyland Fleetline London Transport double-decker bus prefix
 Diminishing manufacturing sources

See also
DM (disambiguation)
DOMS (disambiguation)